Radio is the fifth studio album by Jamaican reggae and hip-hop artist Ky-Mani Marley, released on September 25, 2007. It topped the Billboard Reggae Charts at #1 in October 2007. The album features much more hip hop influences than his previous releases.

Track listing

References

External links 
 Official website of Ky-Mani Marley

Ky-Mani Marley albums
2007 albums